Guttormur Andrasson (died 1572 in Bergen), was, from 1544 to 1572, lawman of the Faroe Islands.

Guttormur Andrasson was the son of previous lawman Andras Guttormsson from Sumba, and father of later lawman Ísak Guttormsson.

References

G.V.C. Young's textbook Færøerne - fra vikingetiden til reformationen, 1982
Løgtingið 150 - Hátíðarrit. Tórshavn 2002, Bind 2, S. 366. (Avsnitt Føroya løgmenn fram til 1816) (PDF-Download )

Year of birth missing
1572 deaths
Lawmen of the Faroe Islands
16th-century heads of government
16th-century Norwegian people